Kenya competed at the 2016 Winter Youth Olympics in Lillehammer, Norway from 12 to 21 February 2016.

Alpine skiing

Kenya had qualified a one girl athlete.

Girls

See also
Kenya at the 2016 Summer Olympics
Kenya at the 2018 Winter Olympics

References

Nations at the 2016 Winter Youth Olympics
Kenya at the Youth Olympics
2016 in Kenyan sport